The ValveKing was a series of guitar amplifiers made by Peavey Electronics. The series include the Royal 8, Micro Head, VK20 Combo, 112 Combo, 212 Combo, 100 Head and matching speaker cabinets. The first generation ValveKing's were available approximately 2005-2013, then there was a second generation with a different look and some new features which eventually was discontinued around 2018.

References

Instrument amplifiers
Peavey amplifiers